Dalhousie Station is a former railway station in Montreal, Quebec, Canada. Built in 1884, the building stands at the corner of Notre-Dame Street and Berri Street in what is now Old Montreal. The oldest surviving railway station building in Montreal,  Dalhousie Station was named after George Ramsay, 9th Earl of Dalhousie, who was Governor General of Canada from 1825 to 1828.

Although the terminal location was originally purchased by the Quebec, Montreal, Ottawa and Occidental Railway, all construction was done by the Canadian Pacific Railway after it purchased the QMO&O in 1882. Dalhousie Station thus became the original eastern terminus for CP Rail.

The station building has been the home of the Cirque Éloize since 2004.

Operation
The first non-stop transcontinental train left Dalhousie Station bound for Port Moody, British Columbia, on June 28, 1886, at 8:00 p.m.

Only five years after opening Dalhousie Station, Canadian Pacific opened a second Montreal terminal, Windsor Station, in February 1889. It had better access to rail routes to the United States, southern Quebec, and southern Ontario, as well as a more convenient location on the west side of town. After a new, shorter line to Ottawa via Rigaud opened in 1898, the transcontinental route was also redirected to Windsor Station.

Dalhousie Station was superseded by the grander Place Viger Station, a block to the north of Dalhousie Station, in 1898.

Design and redevelopment

Dalhousie Station is architecturally notable for the combination of stone and brick used to build it, as well as for its high windows.

The station is now part of a remodeled Dalhousie Square, completed in 2004, which links Old Montreal and the Faubourg Quebec residential district. Dalhousie Square was designed by Robert Desjardins of the City of Montreal and includes a sculpture by Jocelyne Alloucherie entitled Porte de jour. The redesigned square was honoured by the Canadian Society of Landscape Architects in 2006.

References

External links
 Station building and tracks in Google Maps Street View

Canadian Pacific Railway stations in Quebec
Railway stations in Montreal
Railway stations closed in 1898
Railway stations in Canada opened in 1886
Old Montreal